Operation Marne Avalanche was a US military operation that occurred in southern Baghdad in July 2007 as part of Operation Phantom Thunder. The goal of the offensive operation was to stop southern Baghdad from being used as a haven and to prevent the movement of weapons, munitions and insurgent activity into Baghdad.

Operation details
The operation's intent was to improve security conditions in southern Baghdad and reduce the influence of insurgents in the area.  Another goal of the operation was to stanche the flow of weapons into Baghdad.

Marne Avalanche built on the successes of Task Force Marne's offensive operation, Marne Torch, which began 16 June 2007.  Operation Marne Torch resulted in more than 1,152 structures cleared, 83 suspected insurgents killed, 278 suspected insurgents detained, 51 weapons caches found, 51 boats destroyed and 872 Iraqi citizens entered in a biometric identification system.

Notes

References

Multi National Force Iraq

Military operations of the Iraq War involving the United States
Military operations of the Iraq War involving Iraq
Military operations of the Iraq War in 2007
Iraqi insurgency (2003–2011)